The Federal Consultative Council of South African Railways and Harbours Staff Associations (FCC) was a national trade union federation bringing together unions representing white railway workers in South Africa.

The council was established in 1928 by the Artisan Staff Association and the South African Railways and Harbours Salaried Staff Association.  In 1957, it affiliated to the South African Confederation of Labour (SACOL), a loose grouping.  However, SACOL became gradually more centralised.  In 1975, the FCC decided to disaffiliate, but all but one of its affiliates immediately signed up to SACOL.

Affiliates
As of 1962, the following unions were affiliated to the FCC:

References

National trade union centres of South Africa
Railway labor unions
Trade unions established in 1928
Trade unions disestablished in 1975